Neadmete is a genus of sea snails, marine gastropod mollusks in the family Cancellariidae, the nutmeg snails.

Species
Species within the genus Neadmete include:
 Neadmete ahoi Harasewych & Petit, 2011
 Neadmete cancellata (Kobelt, 1887a)
 Neadmete circumcincta (Dall, 1873)
 Neadmete japonica (E.A. Smith, 1879b)
 Neadmete modesta (Carpenter, 1864)
 Neadmete nakayamai Habe, 1961
 Neadmete okutanii Petit, 1974
 Neadmete profundicola Okutani, 1964
 Neadmete unalashkensis (Dall, 1873)
Species brought into synonymy
 Neadmete sagamiensis Kuroda & Habe, 1971: synonym of Microsveltia sagamiensis (Kuroda & Habe, 1971)

References

 Hemmen J. (2007). Recent Cancellariidae. Wiesbaden, 428pp.

Cancellariidae